Michael John Anthony Howe (19402 January 2002) was a British cognitive psychologist. He was well known as a defender of environmental influences on intelligence, and as an opponent of IQ, and he was regularly involved in the controversies surrounding that area of research (see, e.g., Howe, 1997b). As a widely cited example of this work, with colleagues Davidson & Sloboda he argued against the existence of innate talent, a position welcomed by some, but characterised as "Absurd environmentalism" by researchers such as Douglas Detterman.

Early life and education
Howe took BSc and PhD degrees at the University of Sheffield and worked at North American universities (Dalhousie, Tufts and Alberta) before taking a post as lecturer at the University of Exeter in England, where he worked for the rest of his career, eventually becoming the University's first Professor of Cognitive Psychology.

Career
Howe pioneered the use of biography as a means of investigation within modern cognitive psychology (e.g. Howe, 1997a).  He particularly applied it to the study of musical genius and other exceptional abilities, a subject that he investigated extensively (e.g. Howe, 1990, 1999), including the abilities of idiot savants (e.g. Howe, 1989).  He wrote over 20 books, including university text books (e.g. Howe, 1977, 1998) and more popular works (e.g. Howe & Griffey, 1995). His books were widely translated and  many are still in print.

Later life and death
Howe formally retired in 2001 but continued his academic work without interruption; however he died suddenly on 2 January 2002 following a stroke.

References

Sources
Sloboda, J., Hartley, J., & Ceci, S. (2002).  Obituary: Michael Howe (1940-2002).  Psychology of Music, 30, 6-7.
Kaufman, S.B. (2013). Epilogue: Michael Howe Remembered. The Complexity of Greatness: Beyond Talent or Practice

Selected bibliography
Howe, M. J. A. (1977).  Adult learning.  Chichester: Wiley.
Howe, M. J. A. (1989).  Fragments of genius: the strange feats of idiot savants.  London: Routledge
Howe, M. J. A. (1990).  The origins of exceptional abilities. Oxford: Basil Blackwell.
Howe, M. J. A. (1997a).  Beyond psychobiography: towards more effective syntheses of  psychology and biography.  British Journal of Psychology, 88, 235-248.
Howe, M. J. A. (1997b).  IQ in question: The truth about intelligence.  London: Sage.
Howe, M. J. A. (1998).  Principles of abilities and human learning.  Hove: Psychology Press.
Howe, M. J. A. (1999).  Genius explained.  Cambridge: Cambridge University Press.
Howe, M. J. A., & Griffey, H. (1995).  Give your child a better start: how to encourage early learning.  London: Penguin.

1940 births
2002 deaths
Academics of the University of Exeter
Alumni of the University of Sheffield
British psychologists
British cognitive scientists
20th-century psychologists